Chandra Siddhartha is an Indian film director, screenwriter and producer known for his works in Telugu cinema. He is known for his directorial works such as The Inscrutable Americans (2001) which premiered at Milan, New York, Atlanta, London and Kerala International Film Festivals. He received three state Nandi Awards for works such as Aa Naluguru (2004), and Andari Bandhuvaya (2010). In 1995, he produced Nirantharam which was screened at the Cairo International Film Festival. He served as Jury member at the 57th, 61st and 65th National Film Awards, as well as the 49th IFFI.

Early life and career
Chandra Siddhartha was born to C. Poorna Chandra Rao and C. Sakunthala Devi. Siddhartha has attended Nizam College in Hyderabad and holds a degree in Telugu Literature, from Osmania University. He has worked as an Assistant director for the 1991 film Jaitra Yatra with Uppalapati Narayana Rao.

Awards
Nandi Awards
Nandi Award for Best Feature Film (director) - Aa Naluguru
Nandi Award for Akkineni Award for best home-viewing feature film - Andari Bandhuvaya
Nandi Special Jury Award - Andari Bandhuvaya

Filmography
As director

As producer
Nirantharam (1995)
House Full

References

Nandi Award winners
21st-century Indian film directors
Telugu film directors
Living people
Telugu film producers
Film directors from Andhra Pradesh
1969 births
Film producers from Andhra Pradesh
Indian documentary film directors
Indian experimental filmmakers
Indian documentary filmmakers
Indian male screenwriters
Osmania University alumni
21st-century Indian dramatists and playwrights
20th-century Indian dramatists and playwrights
Screenwriters from Telangana